Stirling County RFC is a Scottish rugby union club based in Stirling. The club plays its home games at Bridgehaugh. It runs a number of sides.

History 

During the season of 2004–05, Stirling County celebrated its centenary. Rugby has its origins in the town in the 1870s, resulting in the formation of Stirling HSFP in the latter part of the nineteenth century. The F.P. club joined the Scottish Rugby Union in 1904, hence the celebration of the centenary this season. In 1925, Bridge of Allan Rugby Club was founded with both clubs uniting in 1946 to form Stirling County.

While the team of 1959–60 went undefeated, it was not until the formation of the national leagues in the 1970s that Stirling had a springboard to success. Another vital factor was the creation of a strong and vibrant youth section at this time. In 1995, County achieved the unique distinction of being the first club to rise through the ranks from the depths of the seventh division and win the Scottish Championship.

Uniquely, the club played against the Barbarians at Stirling Albion F.C. home, Forthbank Stadium in 1995. The club has been prolific in producing a large number of age-group internationalists while senior internationalists who have worn County's colours include George Graham, Allister Hogg, Ian Jardine, Alastair Kellock, Kenny Logan, Kevin McKenzie,  James McLaren,  Grant Gilchrist, Adam Ashe, Nick Grigg Jamie Bhatti and Finn Russell.

In 2012–13, County recorded their highest league finish for 16 years, third place in RBS Premier One, and qualified for the cross-border British & Irish Cup competition for the second consecutive year.

Stirling County also has the most successful youth set-up, winning the Scottish National Youth League Cup more times than any other team,

Stirling County RFC Squad compete in the Scottish Rugby Super 6 Competition

Stirling County's Wolves XV compete in National League Division 1 while the Wolves Second XV play in West Reserve League Division 1.

Stirling County's Women's play in the top-flight BT Women's Premier League.

Current squad

Glasgow Warriors players drafted:

  Callum Norrie
  Harris McLeod
  Finlay Burgess
  Ben Salmon
  Logan Jarvie

Table

Sevens

The club run the Stirling Sevens tournament. Teams play for the Dr. Welsh Cup. The tournament began in 1948, two years after the County side was created.

Honours

Men

 Stirling Sevens
 Champions (12): 1978, 1979, 1980, 1981, 1983, 1985, 1986, 1989, 1990, 1994, 1995, 2013
 Scottish Premiership
 Champions (1): 1994-95
 Hawick Wanderers & PSA Sevens
 Champions (1): 1990
 Lochaber Sevens
 Champions (1): 1994
 Highland Sevens
 Champions (5): 1982, 1983, 1984, 1993, 1996
 Arran Sevens
 Champion (2): 1994, 1996
 Mull Sevens
 Champions (7): 1991, 1993, 1997, 1998, 2007, 2009, 2011
 Alloa Sevens
 Champions (2): 1990, 1995
 Strathendrick Sevens
 Champions (2): 1994, 1998
 Glenrothes Sevens
 Champions (1): 1983
 Earlston Sevens
 Champions (1): 1995
 Ayr Sevens
 Champions (1): 1987
 Kirkcaldy Sevens
 Champions (1): 1984
 Currie Sevens
 Champions (1): 1993
 Greenock Sevens
 Champions (1): 1991
 Crieff Sevens
 Champions (2): 2010, 2011

Women

 Mull Sevens
 Champions (2): 2014, 2015

References

External links 
 

Scottish rugby union teams
Rugby clubs established in 1946
1946 establishments in Scotland
Rugby union in Stirling